AU Microscopii (AU Mic) is a young small star located about  away – about 8 times as far as the closest star after the Sun. The apparent visual magnitude of AU Microscopii is 8.73, which is too dim to be seen with the naked eye. It was given this designation because it is in the southern constellation Microscopium and is a variable star. Like β Pictoris, AU Microscopii has a circumstellar disk of dust known as a debris disk and at least two exoplanets.

Stellar properties
AU Mic is a young star at only 22 million years old; less than 1% of the age of the Sun. With a stellar classification of M1 Ve, it is red dwarf star with a physical radius of 75% that of the Sun. Despite being half the Sun's mass, it is radiating only 9% as much luminosity as the Sun. This energy is being emitted from the star's outer atmosphere at an effective temperature of 3,700 K, giving it the cool orange-red hued glow of an M-type star. AU Microscopii is a member of the β Pictoris moving group. AU Microscopii may be gravitationally bound to the binary star system AT Microscopii. It ever not entered the main sequence, but will enter it relatively soon, and on MS it will be approximately 100 K hotter and will have nearly half of its current luminosity.

AU Microscopii has been observed in every part of the electromagnetic spectrum from radio to X-ray and is known to undergo flaring activity at all these wavelengths. Its flaring behaviour was first identified in 1973. Underlying these random outbreaks is a nearly sinusoidal variation in its brightness with a period of 4.865 days. The amplitude of this variation changes slowly with time. The V band brightness variation was approximately 0.3 magnitudes in 1971; by 1980 it was merely 0.1 magnitudes.

Planetary system 

AU Microscopii's debris disk has an asymmetric structure and an inner gap or hole cleared of debris, which has led a number of astronomers to search for planets orbiting AU Microscopii.  By 2007, no searches had led to any detections of planets. However, in 2020 the discovery of a Neptune-sized planet was announced. Its rotation axis is well aligned with the rotation axis of the parent star, misalignment being equal to 5°. 

Since 2018, the second planet AU Microscopii c was suspected to exist. It was confirmed in December 2020, after additional transit events were documented by the TESS observatory.

A third planet in the system was suspected since 2022, and "validated" in 2023, although several possible orbital periods of planet d cannot be ruled out yet.

Debris disk

AU Microscopii harbors its own disk of dust, first resolved at optical wavelengths in 2003 by Paul Kalas and collaborators using the University of Hawaii 2.2-m telescope on Mauna Kea, Hawaii.  This large debris disk faces the earth edge-on, and measures at least 200 AU in radius.  At these large distances from the star, the lifetime of dust in the disk exceeds the age of AU Microscopii.  The disk has a gas to dust mass ratio of no more than 6:1, much lower than the usually assumed primordial value of 100:1.  The debris disk is therefore referred to as "gas-poor".  The total amount of dust visible in the disk is estimated to be at least a lunar mass, while the larger planetesimals from which the dust is produced are inferred to have at least six lunar masses.

The spectral energy distribution of AU Microscopii's debris disk at submillimetre wavelengths indicate the presence of an inner hole in the disk extending to 17 AU, while scattered light images estimate the inner hole to be 12 AU in radius.  Combining the spectral energy distribution with the surface brightness profile yields a smaller estimate of the radius of the inner hole, 1 - 10 AU.

The inner part of the disk is asymmetric and shows structure in the inner 40 AU.  The inner structure has been compared with that expected to be seen if the disk is influenced by larger bodies or has undergone recent planet formation.

The surface brightness (brightness per area) of the disk in the near infrared  as a function of projected distance  from the star follows a characteristic shape. The inner  of the disk appear approximately constant in density and the brightness is unchanging, more-or-less flat. This "broken power-law" shape is similar to the shape of the profile of β Pic's disk.

In October 2015 it was reported that astronomers using the Very Large Telescope (VLT) had detected very unusual outward-moving features in the disk. By comparing the VLT images with those taken by the Hubble Space Telescope in 2010 and 2011 it was found that the wave-like structures are moving away from the star at speeds of up to 10 kilometers per second (22,000 miles per hour). The waves farther away from the star seem to be moving faster than those close to it, and at least three of the features are moving fast enough to escape the gravitational pull of the star.

Methods of observation

AU Mic's disk has been observed at a variety of different wavelengths, giving humans different types of information about the system. The light from the disk observed at optical wavelengths is stellar light that has reflected (scattered) off dust particles into Earth's line of sight. Observations at these wavelengths utilize a coronagraphic spot to block the bright light coming directly from the star.  Such observations provide high-resolution images of the disk. Because light having a wavelength longer than the size of a dust grain is scattered only poorly, comparing images at different wavelengths (visible and near-infrared, for example) gives humans information about the sizes of the dust grains in the disk.

Optical observations have been made with the Hubble Space Telescope and Keck Telescopes.  The system has also been observed at infrared and sub-millimeter wavelengths. This light is emitted directly by dust grains as a result of their internal heat (modified blackbody radiation). The disk cannot be resolved at these wavelengths, so such observations are measurements of the amount of light coming from the entire system. Observations at increasingly longer wavelengths give information about dust particles of larger sizes and at larger distances from the star. These observations have been made with the James Clerk Maxwell Telescope and Spitzer Space Telescope.

References

External links

 

Microscopium
M-type main-sequence stars
Circumstellar disks
Microscopii, AU
197481
Articles containing video clips
0803
102409
Durchmusterung objects
Planetary systems with two confirmed planets
Beta Pictoris moving group